Colonial Architect may refer to:

 Colonial Architect of South Australia
 Queensland Colonial Architect, a position with responsibility for the design of government buildings in Queensland

See also
Government Architect (disambiguation)